Vafa Hakhamaneshi (born 27 March 1991) is an Iranian professional footballer who plays as a centre-back for Indian Super League club Chennaiyin.

Club career

Earlier career
Hakhamaneshi joined Naft Tehran in 2011, having spent the 2009–2010 season at Sepahan Novin in the Azadegan League before joining Foolad Natanz in 2010.

He won the 2013–14 Iran Pro League with Foolad.

Hakhamaneshi made three appearances for Thai League 1 side Ratchaburi Mitr Phol F.C. in the AFC Champions League.

Chennaiyin
In June 2022, Hakhamaneshi moved to Indian Super League club Chennaiyin on a one-year deal. On 1 September, he scored a goal from a header on his club debut against TRAU in the Durand Cup, which ended in a 4–1 win.

On 14 October 2022, in an Indian Super League home match against Bengaluru, Hakhamaneshi volunteered to go in goal for the last 8 minutes after goalkeeper Debjit Majumder was sent off; he did not concede as the match ended 1–1.

International career
Hakhamaneshi has played for the Iran national under-20 football team.

Career statistics

Club

Honours
Foolad
Iran Pro League: 2013–14

References

External links

Profile on Persianleague

Living people
1991 births
People from Gonbad-e Qabus
Naft Tehran F.C. players
Sepahan Novin players
Foolad FC players
Al-Mina'a SC players
Zob Ahan Esfahan F.C. players
Tractor S.C. players
Vafa Hakhamaneshi
Chennaiyin FC players
Iranian footballers
Association football defenders
Iranian expatriate footballers
Iranian expatriate sportspeople in Iraq
Iranian expatriate sportspeople in Thailand
Iranian expatriate sportspeople in India